Dobele crater is an impact crater in central Latvia. The town of Dobele is built over the site of the crater.

The impact structure is buried and is not visible.

References

Further reading 
 A. Abels. J. Plado Lehtinen. 2002 The Impact Cratering Record of Fennoscandia - A Close Look at the DatabaseSpringer, Berlin, Federal Republic of Germany (DEU)

External links 
 Masaitis, V.L. 1999 Impact structures of northeastern Eurasia: the territories of Russia and adjacent countries, Meteoritics & Planetary Science, v. 34, p. 691-711

Dobele
Impact craters of Latvia
Carboniferous impact craters
Permian impact craters
Geology of Latvia